Mezraa is a village in the Kemah District of Erzincan Province in Turkey.

References

Villages in Kemah District